The Tower of Indomitable Circumstance is a 1981 fantasy role-playing game adventure published by Judges Guild.

Contents
The Tower of Indomitable Circumstance is an adventure for beginning player characters of all character classes. It is the first published game scenario by Quest for Glory co-designer Corey Cole, Cover and some interior illustration by E. L. Perry (now known as Tristan Alexander.

Reception
Ian L. Straus reviewed The Tower of Indomitable Circumstance in The Space Gamer No. 50. Straus commented that "GMs who need a change of pace and have experienced players should buy this adventure if they are willing to correct its flaws. It does play smoothly after you fix the maps."

Reviews
 Different Worlds #18 (Jan., 1982)

References

Judges Guild fantasy role-playing game adventures
Role-playing game supplements introduced in 1981